Artak Apitonian (Armenian: Արտակ Ապիտոնյան, born on August 26, 1971 at Alashkert village, Armavir Province) is an Armenian diplomat. He is the Executive Director of The FUTURE ARMENIAN Development Foundation since February 2022. He was the Deputy Foreign Minister of Armenia in 2018-2021, and Armenian Ambassador to Sweden and Finland in 2013-2018.

Education 
 1977–1987 - studied and graduated with honors from the Secondary School No 1 of Hoktemberyan.
 1987–1991 - studied and graduated with honors from the Department of Oriental Studies, Yerevan State University (Arab studies).
 1991–1992 - studied and graduated from the Bourguiba Institute of Modern Languages, Tunisia (Arabic).
 1993 - Diplomatic long-term special courses at the Egyptian Foreign Ministry's Diplomatic Studies Institute.

Professional experience 
 1993–1995 - Attaché, Middle East Department, Israel division, Ministry of Foreign Affairs of Armenia.
 1995–1997 - Third Secretary, Embassy of Armenia in the Arab Republic of Egypt.
 1997–1998 - Third Secretary, Middle East Department, Israel division.
 1998 - Counsellor, Permanent Mission of Armenia to the United Nations.
 1999–2002 - Third Secretary, Chargé d'Affaires of the Embassy of Armenia in Lebanon.
 2002–2005 - Head of the UN Division, Ministry of Foreign Affairs of Armenia.
 2005–2008 - Counsellor, Deputy Permanent Representative of Armenia to the United Nations, Geneva.
 2008–2009 - Head of the Analytical Department, Ministry of Foreign Affairs of Armenia.
 2009–2013 - Head of the External Relations Department, Office of the President of Armenia.
 2013 - On November 26, by the decree of the President of Armenia, has been relieved of the post of the Head of the Foreign Relations Department of the Office of the President of Armenia.
 2013 - On November 26, by the decree of the President of Armenia, has been appointed as the Ambassador Extraordinary and Plenipotentiary of Armenia to the Kingdom of Sweden.
 2014 - On November 6, by the decree of the President of Armenia, has been appointed as the Ambassador Extraordinary and Plenipotentiary of Armenia to the Republic of Finland.
 2018 - On December 28, by the decision of the Prime Minister of Armenia has been appointed as the Deputy Minister of Foreign Affairs.
 2021 - On February 21, was appointed as Executive Director of The FUTURE ARMENIAN development foundation.

Diplomatic rank 
 Envoy Extraordinary and Minister Plenipotentiary of Armenia (2012):
 Ambassador Extraordinary and Plenipotentiary of Armenia (2016)

References 

1971 births
Living people
Armenian diplomats
Yerevan State University alumni